Revenant Records is an American independent record label based in Austin, Texas, which concentrates on folk and blues. Revenant was formed in 1996 by John Fahey and Dean Blackwood. Revenant's 2001 box set, Screamin' and Hollerin' the Blues: The Worlds of Charley Patton, won three Grammy Awards in 2003.

Revenant gained fame among free jazz fans in 2004 when it released Holy Ghost: Rare & Unissued Recordings (1962-70), a 9-CD box set of rare and unissued recordings and interviews by saxophonist Albert Ayler.

Other notable releases from Revenant are Harry Smith's Anthology of American Folk Music, Vol. 4 (2000) and John Fahey's posthumous album Red Cross (2003).

See also 
 List of record labels
 Grammy Awards of 2003

References

External links
 Official site

American record labels
Record labels established in 1996
Folk record labels
Blues record labels
Reissue record labels